Stanisława Alicja Prządka (born 6 May 1943 in Karczmiska) is a Polish politician. She was elected to Sejm on 25 September 2005, getting 7674 votes in 18 Siedlce district as a candidate from Democratic Left Alliance list.

She was also a member of Sejm 2001-2005.

See also
Members of Polish Sejm 2005-2007

External links
Stanisława Prządka - parliamentary page - includes declarations of interest, voting record, and transcripts of speeches.

1943 births
Living people
Democratic Left Alliance politicians
Members of the Polish Sejm 2001–2005
Members of the Polish Sejm 2005–2007
Members of the Polish Sejm 2007–2011
Members of the Polish Sejm 2011–2015